Home at Last is the tenth studio album by American singer and actor, Billy Ray Cyrus. It was released on July 24, 2007, and is follow-up album to Wanna Be Your Joe, which was released in 2006. Home at Last is Cyrus' debut and only album to date for Walt Disney Records.

The album debuted and peaked at number 3 on the U.S. Billboard Top Country Albums, and number 20 on the Billboard 200 and on the Billboard Top Comprehensive Albums. This became Cyrus's first album in 13 years to reach certification as it is certified Gold by the RIAA for sales of 500,000 copies. It also set a record for a father-daughter duo to have their own Top 20 album on the Billboard 200. When Home at Last debuted, Miley's album, Hannah Montana 2: Meet Miley Cyrus was at number 1.

Background

The album's lead-off single, "Ready, Set, Don't Go", debuted at number 47 for the chart week of August 11, 2007, on the Billboard Hot Country Songs, making it Billy Ray's first chart entry since 2004 with "The Other Side". On October 9, 2007, Billy Ray and Miley performed a duet of the song on Dancing with the Stars.

The duet debuted on the chart on October 27, 2007, at number 27. It eventually reached number 4 on the country charts, giving Billy Ray his first Top 5 single since "Busy Man" reached number 3 in 1999. It was also Miley's first Top 5 on any Billboard chart, as well as her first release to country radio.

After "Ready, Set, Don't Go" fell from the country music charts, no further singles were released. Cyrus began to work on his next studio album. The album was released on Lyric Street Records on April 7, 2009. It was titled Back to Tennessee.

The track "Stand" was originally recorded as a duet with Miley Cyrus on Billy Ray's previous album Wanna Be Your Joe. However, the song was remixed without Miley's vocals and was added to Home at Last.

Track listing

Personnel
Billy Ray Cyrus – lead vocals, backing vocals
Additional musicians
 David Angell – violin
 Kenny Aronoff – drums
 Sam Bacco – percussion
 Richard Bennett – acoustic guitar
 Mike Brignardello – bass
 Pat Buchanan – electric guitar
 Tom Bukovac – electric guitar
 Tim Buppert – backing vocals
 David J. Carpenter – bass
 Butch Carr – backing vocals
 John Catchings – cello
 Vinnie Colaiuta – drums
 Miley Cyrus – vocals on track 14
 Matt Dame – backing vocals
 Eric Darken – percussion
 David Davidson – violin
 Andy Dodd – electric guitar, piano
 Dan Dugmore – steel guitar
 Stuart Duncan – mandocello
 Connie Ellisor – violin
 Kenny Greenberg – electric guitar
 Jim Grosjean – viola
 Tom Hambridge – backing vocals
 James Harrah – acoustic guitar, electric guitar
 Tony Harrell – accordion, keyboard
 Aubrey Haynie – fiddle
 John Hobbs – keyboard
 Mike Johnson – steel guitar
 Troy Johnson – backing vocals
 John Jorgenson – electric guitar, banjo
 Shane Keister – keyboard
 Karima Kibble – choir
 Sherrie Kibble – choir
 Anthony LaMarchina – cello
 Paul Leim – drums, percussion
 Matthew McMauley – conductor, string arrangement
 Fred Mollin – 12-string acoustic guitar, Hammond organ, synthesizer, backing vocals
 Greg Morrow – drums
 Kathy Niebank – backing vocals
 Emily Osment – vocals on track 7
 Dean Parks – dobro, acoustic guitar, electric guitar, mandolin
 Larry Paxton – bass
 Shandra Penix – choir
 Matt Rollings – keyboard
 Joe Scaife – backing vocals
 Pam Sixfin – violin
 Elisabeth K. Small – violin
 Chris Stapleton – backing vocals
 Peter Stengaard – bass, keyboard, backing vocals
 Mary Kathryn Van Osdale – violin
 Adam Watts – drums, acoustic guitar, backing vocals
 John Paul White – backing vocals
 Kris Wilkinson – viola
 John Willis – acoustic guitar, electric guitar, mandolin, soloist
 Karen Winklemann – violin
 Suzanne Young – choir
 Russ Zavitson – backing vocals

Chart performance

The album debuted at number 3 on Billboards Top Country Albums chart; Cyrus' first Top 5 album since It Won't Be the Last in 1993. It also debuted at number 20 on the all-genres charts Billboard 200 and Billboards Top Comprehensive Albums, selling approximately 30,000 copies in its first official week of release. To date, the album has sold over 297,000 copies in the United States and over 500,000 copies worldwide. Weekly chartsYear-end chartsSingles'

References

2007 albums
Billy Ray Cyrus albums
Walt Disney Records albums